The National Shooting Centre is the UK's largest shooting sports complex, comprising several shooting ranges as well as the large "Bisley Camp" complex of accommodation, clubhouses and support services. The centre is located near the village of Bisley in Surrey from which it takes its colloquial name "Bisley ranges". The site is wholly owned by the National Rifle Association (NRA). The NSC is the trading name of the facility.

History
The NRA Imperial Meeting (the Association's National Championship) was first held at Wimbledon Common in 1860. In 1890, the village of Bisley became the location for the NRA Imperial Meeting (the Association's National Championship). The headquarters of the British NRA was also moved from Wimbledon to Bisley Camp at that time.

Bisley hosted most of the shooting events in the 1908 Olympic Games, and all the shooting for the 2002 Commonwealth Games. During the 2012 Olympic Games the shooting was held at the Royal Artillery Barracks, Woolwich.

As well as the rifle ranges, there are two clay target shooting complexes; The National Clay Shooting Centre, which caters for 'trap' disciplines such as Skeet and DTL, and Bisley Shooting Ground, which caters for sporting clays, or simulated game shooting.

Bisley is famous within shooting circles and has been described as the Marksman's Mecca. Some of the buildings within the grounds are from the Victorian era, having been transported there in the re-location from Wimbledon Common. These had been erected annually, but were now sited permanently. The clock tower, Fulton's Gun Shop and the Exhibition Pavilion are particularly fine examples which survive to this day. Several buildings on the site are listed, including Fulton's, and the Macdonald Stewart Pavilion. Better known as "Canada House", the Pavilion was constructed in 1897 by the Dominion of Canada Rifle Association as a home-away-from-home for the Canadian national team when they attended the Imperial Meeting.

The camp once had its own railway branch line which ran from nearby Brookwood station, and was known as the 'Bisley Bullet'.

In 1894 Colt, the US firearms manufacturer, introduced and sold the Bisley Model of its famous Single Action Army revolver specifically designed for target shooting. This revolver featured a longer grip, a wider hammer spur, a wider trigger and adjustable sights. It was offered in a variety of calibres including .32–20, .38–40, .45 Colt, .44-40.

1990s-Present
Through the 1990s and 2000s, the condition of the camp declined due to financial difficulties at the NRA. The 2002 Commonwealth Games saw some capital investment to the sports facilities, including the construction of the National Clay Shooting Centre. However, other facilities including the accommodation and camping ablutions declined, with the NRA making significant redundancies in 2011 and 2012.

In 2013, new management within the NRA saw a wholesale change in approach to estate management and a new focus on housekeeping the ablutions and catching up with overdue site maintenance. Many derelict static caravans were evicted from pitches where they had been allowed to stand in arrears, and new stands of "serviced" cabins were constructed, providing mains electricity and plumbing - existing caravans had no utility hookups. Controversially, clubhouse leases were also updated to include the value of the buildings, increasing the leasehold significantly. Since 1890, clubs had paid a ground rent and had built their own clubhouses on the site, but in 2013 the NRA took the view that the landlord (the NRA) - not the tenant - owned the building, with lease renewals reflecting this. Several clubs surrendered their clubhouses, unable to afford the new rates. The tenant of the Artist Rifles Clubhouse fought a high profile battle in the media - having rejected the outcome of arbitration. It was eventually established that the NRA did own the building, although improvements made by the tenant were to be accounted for in setting the rent. This episode was widely misreported as involving the "Regimental Clubhouse" of the Artists Rifles Regiment, but the Artists Rifle Club had in fact vacated the building in 1967. The tenant was not connected with the SAS, Artists Rifle Club nor the Regimental Association.

The NSC is also the location of Army Operational Shooting Competition, in which members of the British army compete for the Queen's Medal.

Ranges 
The National Shooting Centre has a number of ranges to cater for differing firearms and shooting disciplines.

Short Siberia 
Short Siberia is situated furthest away from the main Camp area on the far side of Century Range. It is a rifle range with 27 x 100 yard targets and 9 x 200 yard targets.

Century Range 

Century Range was the first range built at Bisley when the NRA moved here in 1890. It has 108 targets and firing points at distances between 100 and 600 yards. Century Range is also the home of the 300 m discipline and the new NRA electronic targets at Butt 19.

Stickledown Range 

The longest range on the Bisley Complex, Stickledown is a Gallery Range with 50 targets to be shot at distances from 800 to 1200 yards. Stickledown is also the home of the Bisley Buffalo. Following successful trials in the Spring of 2017, the NRA purchased 11 electronic targets for installation on Stickledown.

The Bisley Buffalo 
The NRA has installed a steel silhouette of a buffalo on its Stickledown range, allowing Bisley shooters the chance to use a reactive target at long range for the first time.  "Target 51" on Stickledown consists of a 2.4 m x 1.7 m steel buffalo silhouette, painted white. It is available from 800 yds, 900 yds and 1,000 yds and was installed after consultation with the Single Shot Black Powder Cartridge Rifle Club of Great Britain.  Any rifle that fits within the existing Stickledown range restrictions may be used to engage the buffalo.

Zero range 
This range is 71' 7" in distance and is available for fullbore rifle prone shooting only. This range is only available to shooters who are also booked to use another range, as it is intended solely for the safe zeroing of a rifle prior to use. This range has four prone-only bays.

Winans range 
Situated next to the zero range, Winans is a no danger area (NDA) range divided into two independent bays. Bay A offers 10 turning targets out to 25 m. Bay B offers 6 static targets out to 25 m and contains a high velocity canopy and rubber granulate trap. Both bays are suitable for gallery rifle and pistol shooting as well as shotgun slug.

Melville range 
Melville range has a total of five bays. One bay contains seven targets with retrievable mechanisms out to 50 m. Four bays offer gallery rifle and pistol turning targets at 25 and 50 metres. Gallery rifles and pistols only can be shot on this range. Prone .22 calibre rifles can be shot by special arrangement.

Cheylesmore range 
Cheylesmore range is a 25 m no danger area range for gallery rifles and pistols.

Range restrictions

Rifle restrictions 

Gallery rifle and pistol restrictions 

High muzzle energy firearms restrictions 
For these there are additional zeroing procedures

In popular culture 
 The "famous Century Range at Bisley" is used in target practice by James Bond in Ian Fleming's short story "The Living Daylights" (1962)

See also
Bisley – The Queen's Prize – BBC film following the 1986 Imperial Meeting and Queen's Prize, presented by Brian Glover.
Bisley - The First Hundred Years - 1990 short film commissioned by the NRA for the Bisley Centenary

References

External links
 Official Website
 National Rifle Association

Shooting ranges in the United Kingdom
Sports venues in Surrey
National Rifle Association (United Kingdom)